Mumaw is a chapel and funeral home in Lancaster, California. It is a popular location for the funerals of notable local figures.

Notable funerals
 George Hummel (1887–1965) – businessman

References

Churches in Kern County, California
Death care companies of the United States
Buildings and structures in Lancaster, California